Austin Friars, Newcastle-upon-Tyne was an Augustinian friary in Tyne and Wear, England.

The friary is believed to have been founded by William Lord Ros, Baron of Wark on Tweed, about the year 1290, at a site in Cowgate. Around 1540, the friary was closed as part of the dissolution of the monasteries under Henry VIII, and in 1551, the land was granted to John Dudley, 1st Duke of Northumberland.

By 1648, the land had passed to the city council, and a series of institutions built on the site, including hospitals, prisons and guild houses. In 1681 the Holy Jesus Hospital was built partly on the site.

In the 1820s, the site was occupied by the Newcastle Gas Company, local hospitals, and the Barber Surgeon's Company, who had leased part of the land since 1648.

References

Monasteries in Tyne and Wear